Ivo Svetina (born 9 September 1948) is a Slovene poet, playwright and translator. He has won numerous awards for his plays and poetry collections. In 1998 he was appointed Director of the National Theatre Museum of Slovenia. In 2014 he was elected President of the Slovene Writers' Association.

Svetina was born in Ljubljana in 1948. He studied comparative literature at the University of Ljubljana and worked in numerous experimental theatre companies in the late 1960s and 1970s. He worked at RTV Slovenia and the Mladinsko Theatre.

He won the Prešeren Foundation Award in 1988 for his poetry collection Peti rokopisi and in 2010 the Jenko Award for his poetry collection Sfingin hlev.

Selected works

Poetry collections

 Plovi na jagodi pupa magnolija do zlatih vladnih palač (1971)
 Heliks in Tibija (1973)
 Botticelli (1975)
 Vaša partijska ljubezen, Očetje! Herojska smrt življenje (1976)
 Joni (1976)
 Dissertationes (1977)
 Bulbul (1982)
 Marija in živali (1986)
 Péti rokopisi (1987)
 Knjiga očetove smrti: videnja, izreki 1989 (1990)
 Almagest (1991)
 Disciplina bolečine: stance praznine (1993)
 Glasovi snega (1993)
 Disciplina bolečine (1993)
 Zakoni vode in lesa: 1993-1995 (1997)
 Svitanice (1998)
 Svit (2000)
 Stihi, videnja, izreki (2001)
 Oblak in gora (2003)
 Pesmi nevednosti (2004)
 Lesbos (2005)
 Vrt pozabe (2005)
 Na obali oceana tovarna poezije (2008)
 Pes in Perzijci (2008)
 Stimmen slowenischer Lyrik 2 (2008)
 Sfingin hlev (2010)

Plays 
 Lepotica in zver ali Kaj se je zgodilo z Danico D.? (1985)
 Biljard na Capriju/Šeherezada (1989)
 Zgodba iz južnega gozda ali Kdo je ubil sonce (1989)
 Tibetanska knjiga mrtvih (1992)
 Kamen in zrno (1993)
 Vrtovi in golobica (1994)
 Zarika in sončnica (1995)
 Tako je umrl Zaratuštra (1996)
 Babilon (1996)
 Ojdip v Korintu (1999)

Children's Literature 
 Aves, ptičji kralj (1990)
 Pravljica o jari kači (1990)
 Deček in muha (1990)
 Kozel vrtnar (1993)
 Belin (1997)

References

Slovenian poets
Slovenian male poets
Slovenian dramatists and playwrights
Living people
1948 births
Veronika Award laureates
University of Ljubljana alumni
Presidents of the Slovene Writers' Association
Writers from Ljubljana